is a Japanese businessman, the former president and chief executive officer (CEO) of Japan Post Holdings, a Japanese state-owned conglomerate, the 26th largest company in the world, in the Fortune Global 500.

References

Living people
1936 births
Japanese chief executives